Zak O'Sullivan (born 6 February 2005) is a British racing driver of Irish descent who is currently competing in the 2023 FIA Formula 3 Championship for Prema Racing. He most recently competed in the 2022 FIA Formula 3 Championship for Carlin. He is the  champion of the 2021 GB3 Championship, and a member of the Williams Driver Academy.

He was awarded the Aston Martin Autosport BRDC Award for 2021.

Career

Karting 
Having taken up the sport when he was just nine years old, O'Sullivan started his competitive karting career in 2014, where he won the British Super One Rookie Championship. After competing in the national Super 1 Championship in 2015 he won the MSA Kartmasters British Grand Prix, and in 2017 the Brit first raced in Europe, coming twelfth in the CIK-FIA European Championship with Ricky Flynn Motorsport. O'Sullivan remained with the team in 2018 and achieved his best international karting result by finishing second in the German Karting Championship in the junior class. That same year he also made his first and only appearance in the Karting World Championship.

Ginetta Junior Championship 
In 2019 O'Sullivan made his car racing debut in the Ginetta Junior Championship with Douglas Motorsport. He scored five podiums in the first ten races of the season, however his results improved after he made a switch to R Racing in the middle of the season. O'Sullivan won two races at Snetterton and one at Thruxton, and thanks to a podium streak that lasted for nine consecutive races he finished second in the championship, which made him the highest-placed rookie.

F4 British Championship 
For the 2020 season the Brit moved up to the F4 British Championship, partnering Christian Mansell and Matías Zagazeta at Carlin. He started the season off strongly, with a win at the season-opening round at Donington Park and two victories at the Brands Hatch Grand Prix Circuit. Throughout the following three rounds however, O'Sullivan was overtaken in the standings by Luke Browning, who had won all three races at Oulton Park and another two at Knockhill. O'Sullivan bounced back with a run of nine consecutive podium finishes, which included four race wins as well as four second places. At the final race of the season, O'Sullivan won the race and was initially crowned champion. However, it turned out that, due to a red flag, only half the number of points were distributed, meaning that O'Sullivan fell behind Browning in the championship and became vice-champion, only three points behind his rival.

GB3 Championship 

O'Sullivan remained with Carlin for 2021, progressing to the GB3 Championship with his previous teammate Christian Mansell and American Bryce Aron. His first race win in the series came at the second race of the first round at Brands Hatch, which led to him taking an early championship lead. A pair of victories from Reece Ushijima at the next round put O'Sullivan's lead under threat, but the Brit was able to get away from his championship rivals by winning the first two races of the third weekend at Donington Park, having started both from pole position. He extended his advantage further by finishing second twice at both Spa-Francorchamps and Snetterton respectively, and would get back to winning ways in the reversed-grid race in Silverstone. Another victory followed in the first race at Oulton Park, and a sixth place in race 3, one where he overtook ten of his rivals, put O'Sullivan on the cusp of winning the title. He would go on to control the first race of the final round, thus clinching the title in dominant fashion.

For his efforts, O'Sullivan was nominated for the 2021 Autosport BRDC Award, and in February 2022, received that honour ahead of Jonny Edgar, Louis Foster and Oliver Bearman. In addition, in December 2021, the BRDC awarded O'Sullivan with the Jim Clark Trophy for winning the GB3 title.

FIA Formula 3 Championship

2022 
For 2022, O'Sullivan once again reunited with Carlin to contest the FIA Formula 3 Championship. The Briton qualified 12th for reverse pole for the sprint race in Bahrain. He would slip back, but managed to score points in sixth place. In Imola he would qualify eighth, but was penalised three places for the sprint race for impeding Reece Ushijima. His sprint race would be disappointing, losing the car and crashing out on lap 9. In the feature race, he stayed out of trouble and brought sixth place. O'Sullivan had a poor round in Barcelona scoring no points, but bounced back in Silverstone with an unexpected pole position, describing it as "really nice". He would lose his lead to Arthur Leclerc on Sunday, but was able to narrowly hold off Ollie Bearman for second, scoring his first podium in the category. Another positive surprise came in the Budapest feature race. Having changed to dry tyres as the damp conditions were disappearing in the last third of the feature race, O'Sullivan was able to make his way up, overtaking car after car to finish fourth place by race's end. He had a disappointing Spa-Francorchamps round despite starting from reverse pole, as he damaged his front wing during a first lap battle with Juan Manuel Correa. After qualifying tenth and starting third in the sprint at Zandvoort O'Sullivan took his second podium which ended up being his final points finish of the season. In the feature race, he ran in tenth for majority of the race but was overtaken by Bearman in the final stages, and O'Sullivan was given a penalty for contact with him, dropping him to the back. After failing to score points during the Monza finale, O'Sullivan ended his rookie campaign 11th in the standings with 54 points and two podiums, whilst helping Carlin to seventh place and its best year yet. During the F3 Prize Giving ceremony, O'Sullivan won the Comeback Of The Year for his comethru drive in Budapest.

2023 
O'Sullivan drove for Prema Racing on all three days during the post-season test at the Jerez Circuit. In November 2022, O'Sullivan was announced to be joining Prema for the 2023 F3 season.

Formula One 
In February 2022, it was announced O'Sullivan would join the Williams Driver Academy. During late October, O'Sullivan got his first taste of F1 machinery, driving the Aston Martin AMR21 at the Silverstone Circuit as part of his reward for claiming the Autosport BRDC Award the previous year.

Personal life 
O'Sullivan lived and grew up in Cheltenham. His racing hero was seven-time Formula One champion Michael Schumacher.

Karting record

Karting career summary

Complete CIK-FIA Karting European Championship results 
(key) (Races in bold indicate pole position) (Races in italics indicate fastest lap)

Racing record

Racing career summary 

* Season still in progress.

Complete F4 British Championship results 
(key) (Races in bold indicate pole position) (Races in italics indicate fastest lap)

‡ Half points were awarded for Race 3, as less than 75% of the scheduled distance was completed.

Complete GB3 Championship results 
(key) (Races in bold indicate pole position) (Races in italics indicate fastest lap)

Complete FIA Formula 3 Championship results 
(key) (Races in bold indicate pole position; races in italics indicate points for the fastest lap of top ten finishers)

References

External links 
 
 

2005 births
Living people
British racing drivers
British people of Irish descent
BRDC British Formula 3 Championship drivers
Ginetta Junior Championship drivers
Carlin racing drivers
British F4 Championship drivers
FIA Formula 3 Championship drivers
Karting World Championship drivers
Prema Powerteam drivers